Carlisle House may refer to:

in England
Carlisle House, the site of one of London Debating Societies and one of just four places Women in the Enlightenment debated
Carlisle House, Soho, either of two late seventeenth-century mansions in Soho Square, London
Carlisle House, in Morpeth, Northumberland
Carlisle House, Lambeth, a home of Samuel Bradford

in the United States
(by state then town or city)
Kenworthy Hall, also known as the Carlisle-Martin House and Carlisle Hall, NRHP-listed, near Marion, Alabama
Carlisle House (Milford, Delaware), listed on the NRHP in Sussex County, Delaware
Knights of Pythias Pavilion, in Franklin, Tennessee, NRHP-listed, also known as Carlisle House
Tubbs-Carlisle House, Lubbock, Texas, NRHP-listed

See also
Carlisle Castle, Cumbria, England